The following lists events that happened in 2005 in Djibouti.

Incumbents
President: Ismaïl Omar Guelleh
Prime Minister: Dileita Mohamed Dileita

Events

March
 March 10 - Mohamed Daoud Chehem, the only opposition candidate in the forthcoming presidential elections, withdraws from the race. The incumbent President Ismail Omar Guelleh remains the only candidate in the elections of April 8.

April
 April 8 - Presidential elections begin in Djibouti. Incumbent president Ismail Omar Guelleh is the only candidate.

References

 
Years of the 21st century in Djibouti
Djibouti
Djibouti
2000s in Djibouti